Maud Ingeborg Ekendahl (born 16 July 1949) is a Swedish politician of the Moderate Party. She was a member of the Riksdag from 1995 to 2002 and then again from 2004 to 2006.

External links
Maud Ekendahl at the Riksdag website

Members of the Riksdag from the Moderate Party
Living people
1959 births
Women members of the Riksdag
Members of the Riksdag 2002–2006
21st-century Swedish women politicians